Múcsony is a village in Borsod-Abaúj-Zemplén County in northeastern Hungary.

Etymology
The name is of Slavic origin and it probably comes from Mučín or Milčín/Miličín. 1219 Mulchun.

References

External links

  in Hungarian

Populated places in Borsod-Abaúj-Zemplén County